Babies is a 2020 American documentary web television series. The premise revolves around 15 families around the world during the first year of the life of their babies.

Episodes

Release 
Part 1 of Babies was released on February 21, 2020, on Netflix. Part 2 was released on June 19, 2020.

References

External links
 
 
 

2020 American television series debuts
2020s American documentary television series
English-language Netflix original programming
Netflix original documentary television series